Saint Margaret and the Dragon is the title shared by two paintings of Saint Margaret by the Renaissance painter Raphael, both executed in about 1518. One is held in the Kunsthistorisches Museum in Vienna, the other in the Louvre in Paris.

Vienna version 
The painting shows the saint at the moment before she is swallowed alive by the dragon. She is shown unafraid, holding the crucifix that will save her once she is swallowed.

Theatrum Pictorium 
This painting was documented in David Teniers the Younger's catalog Theatrum Pictorium of the art collection of Archduke Leopold Wilhelm in 1659 and again in 1673, but the portrait had already enjoyed notoriety in Teniers' portrayals of the Archduke's art collection.

Paris version 
Another version showing the central figure holding a palm branch is in the collection of the Louvre.

Gallery

See also
List of paintings by Raphael

Notes

References

External links

1518 paintings
16th-century paintings
Paintings of dragons
Paintings by Raphael
Paintings in the collection of the Kunsthistorisches Museum
Paintings in the collection of the Archduke Leopold Wilhelm of Austria